The Hundstein is a mountain in the Alpstein massif of the Appenzell Alps, located south of Schwende in the canton of Appenzell Innerrhoden. It lies on the range east of the Altmann, between the valleys of the Seealpsee and the Fälensee.

References

External links
Hundstein on Hikr

Mountains of the Alps
Mountains of Switzerland
Mountains of Appenzell Innerrhoden
Appenzell Alps
Two-thousanders of Switzerland